Edmund Theodore Sylvers (January 25, 1957 — March 11, 2004) was an American singer–songwriter, actor and musician. Sylvers was best known as the lead singer of the American family disco/soul music vocal group The Sylvers, which had popular success with songs such as "Boogie Fever" during the mid- to late-1970s.

Biography
Born in Memphis, Tennessee, and raised in Los Angeles, California, Sylvers was the fifth child born to Shirley Mae (née Wyble) (1932 — 2014) and Leon Frank Sylvers, Jr. (1932 — 2005). At the age of 14, he began his entertainment career as a voice actor playing the role of Marlon Jackson on the ABC–TV cartoon series The Jackson 5ive. After the series ended when he was 15, Sylvers joined his family-based group as the lead singer, and he was 18 in 1975 when he sang lead on the group's biggest hit, "Boogie Fever". After the group's success passed, Sylvers embarked on a solo career, releasing his debut Have You Heard in 1980.

Personal life and death
Sylvers dated singer Freda Payne (who was 15 years his senior) from 1979 until January 1983. Sylvers had 11 children, one of whom is actor Jeremy Sylvers, who is most known for his role in the 1991 horror film Child's Play 3. After a ten-month battle with lung cancer, Edmund Sylvers died at a Virginia hospital on March 11, 2004, at age 47.

References

External links
 
 Edmund Sylvers at Discogs

1957 births
2004 deaths
American male pop singers
20th-century African-American male singers
American rhythm and blues singers
American disco musicians
Deaths from lung cancer
20th-century American singers
20th-century American male singers
Deaths from cancer in Virginia
21st-century African-American people